The 1941 Bulgarian Cup Final was the 4th final of the Bulgarian Cup (in this period the tournament was named Tsar's Cup), and was contested between AS 23 Sofia and Napredak Ruse on 3 October 1941 at City Stadium in Dobrich. AS 23 won the final 4–2.

Match

Details

See also
1941 Bulgarian State Football Championship

References

Bulgarian Cup finals
Cup Final